Moodoïd is a French psychedelic rock band and a musical fusion project spearheaded by Pablo Padovani, the guitarist for Melody's Echo Chamber. The other members are Clémence on bass guitar, Lucie on keyboards and Lucie on drums. 
 
Moodoïd released its self-titled EP Moodoïd on French label Enterprise in late 2013. The EP was mixed by Tame Impala's Kevin Parker. It was followed by Moodoïd's debut studio album Le monde Möö released on 18 August 2014 on Enterprise and Sony, that included the Moodoïd EP materials as a second CD with the release.

The band is influenced by various genres of rock, pop, folk, metal, psychedelic sounds and international ethnic influences. Members appear in flamboyant clothing and makeup and release colourful music videos including "Les chemins de traverse", "La lune", "Je suis la montagne", "La chanson du ciel de diamants", "De folie pure" etc. Moodoïd appeared as one of the main acts of festival Fnac Live Paris on 19 July 2014.

Members
Pablo Padovani – vocals and frontman. Prior to Moodoïd, he was a guitarist for Melody's Echo Chamber. He is the son of Jean Marc Padovani, a celebrated jazz musician himself who also contributed to the production. He has also directed some short films and music videos.
Clémence Lasme – bass guitar 
Lucie Droga – keyboards 
Lucie Antunes – drums
Maud Nadal – vocal, guitar

Discography

Albums

EP

Singles

Video Director

References

External links
Official website
Facebook

Musical groups from Paris